José Aguirre de Achá (1877 – ?) was a Bolivian writer, politician and lawyer from Cochabamba. He was active as a lawyer during the 1898 revolution and later served as Minister of Education. He was also a diplomat to Colombia, Venezuela and Ecuador.

Works
Platonía; la zona de arbitraje en el litigio boliviano-paraguayo.
La antigua provincia de Chiquitos.

References and sources
References

Sources

1877 births
Year of death missing
Bolivian male writers
Bolivian diplomats
Ambassadors of Bolivia to Venezuela
19th-century Bolivian lawyers
People from Cochabamba
Education ministers of Bolivia
20th-century Bolivian lawyers